The  Jewish Digital Archive Project  (JDAP) is a community project that connects people by creating an online home for old movies, photographs and oral history interviews.

History
The Jewish Digital Archive Project (JDAP) began in 2011. The project is based at The Isaac and Jessie Kaplan Centre at Cape Town University.

The Jewish Digital Archive  is collecting photography, film and oral history interviews for their archives for educational purposes such as academic research as well as for public genealogical interest.

The JDAP can be compared to other broader archival initiatives at UCT for example: The Center for Popular Memory, The Michaelis Photographic Archives,  and The University of Cape Town’s Library Manuscripts and Archives . However, The Jewish Digital Archive Project’s fundamental purpose is to connect members of the Jewish Community in Southern Africa.

Aims
JDAP aims to ensure that future generations benefit from stories of the past and keep up with the present. Taking place in South Africa in a Post- Apartheid era with new digital technology like Adobe Photoshop Lightroom websites and scanners, the project aims to create innovative ways of understanding and preserving legacies from the past. One of the ways JDAP plans to do this is through a website.

This project is taken place during a period where new ways of preserving and archiving are being explored. Once the JDAP website has been constructed, people will be able to view and share their histories and memories with others. The website will be interactive and constantly updated and co-created by the user. There will be a space for comments, insights and identifications which are essential when it comes to helping find people, form links and identify areas and themes of interest. By uploading material on to website film and photographs have less of a risk of being lost or damaged.

Themes
The photograph and film collections trace the history of Jewish people in Southern Africa. Many of these people came from places such as:  Zimbabwe, Potchefstroom, Cuba and Lithuania.  The archive explores the story of the Jewish Immigrants’ early arrival in Southern Africa and the various financial, social and religious circumstances behind these stories of migration.  As well as their experience of assimilation and acculturation into new societies.

Type of Material 
Old Film is brought to the archive, often in the form of 8mm reels. The domestic home video (i.e. the Batmitzvah or wedding film) can illuminate an important period of social history or contain previously unseen footage.  The photography offers visual evidence of a particular time in history.  Oral History Interviews can examine different generations of people through first-hand accounts. The lives of ordinary and prolific people are reflected. Quotidian historical data such as diet, lifestyle, dress, and behavioural codes can shed light on a specific time and place in the past.

Copyright Procedure on Material
The JDAP has the rights for education, research, documentary and marketing use. All donors will be noted alongside their material. The project will make use of digital watermarking on photographs so they can’t be plagiarised.  A copy of the material can be put on DVD  for the donor and the  original material can be given back or stored.

References

External links 
 Memoro website
 Kaplan Center
 Archives Info website
 Rout Ledge Website
 Dap Center
 Europa Archive

University of Cape Town
Digital Archive 
Online archives